The Vancouver ePrix was a planned annual race of the single-seater, electrically powered Formula E championship, planned to be held in Vancouver, British Columbia, Canada. It was expected to be the second Formula E race in the country after the 2017 Montreal ePrix.

On July 8, 2021, it was announced a new race for the electric-powered FIA Formula E World Championship, the Vancouver ePrix would be run on the Vancouver Street Circuit, the previous site of the Molson Indy Vancouver. It would have utilised a different layout to those used previously. However on June 18, 2022, it was announced that the race contract was terminated, due to irregularities with the promoter.

References

cancelled motorsport events